Lachnaia sexpunctata is a species of leaf beetles from the subfamily Cryptocephalinae. It is found from north-eastern France to Turkey and from north to southern Germany and Slovakia.

References

Clytrini
Beetles described in 1763
Taxa named by Giovanni Antonio Scopoli